Rubria is a genus of leafhoppers in the family Cicadellidae, the species of which are found mostly in Australia.  Swedish entomologist Carl Stål described the group as a subgenus of the genus Petalocephala, but later raised it to a genus in its own right in 1966 by J.W. Evans. The genus is a distinct lineage within the family and is placed in its own tribe Rubrini.

References

Ledrinae
Cicadellidae genera